The 2015 German Masters (officially the 2015 Kreativ Dental German Masters) was a professional ranking snooker tournament that took place between 4–8 February 2015 at the Tempodrom in Berlin, Germany. It was the sixth ranking event of the 2014/2015 season.

Judd Trump made the 113th official maximum break during his quarter-final match against Mark Selby.

Ding Junhui was the defending champion, but he lost 4–5 against Ryan Day in the last 32.

Selby won his fifth ranking title by defeating Shaun Murphy 9–7 in the final.

Prize fund
The breakdown of prize money for this year is shown below:

Winner: €80,000
Runner-up: €35,000
Semi-final: €20,000
Quarter-final: €10,000
Last 16: €5,000
Last 32: €3,000
Last 64: €1,500

Televised highest break: €4,000
Maximum break: €6,737
Total: €341,737

Main draw

Final

Qualifying
These matches were held between 17 and 19 December 2014 at the Robin Park Arena, Sports and Tennis Centre in Wigan, England. All matches were best of 9 frames.

Round 1

Round 2

Century breaks

Qualifying stage centuries

 142, 116  Shaun Murphy
 141, 101  Aditya Mehta
 136, 131  Ding Junhui
 136  Daniel Wells
 136  Ian Burns
 135, 134, 105, 101  Neil Robertson
 135  Ali Carter
 133  Zak Surety
 132  Mark Davis
 131, 121  Michael Wasley
 127  Mark Allen
 121  Adam Duffy
 120, 114, 105  Judd Trump
 117, 106, 104  Ronnie O'Sullivan
 117  Robin Hull

 117  Ryan Day
 115, 103  Li Hang
 115  Matthew Stevens
 115  Michael White
 113  Xiao Guodong
 112  David Gilbert
 109  Sam Baird
 107  Mitchell Mann
 105  Alfie Burden
 104  Michael Leslie
 104  Michael Holt
 103  Yu Delu
 103  Oliver Lines
 102  Jack Lisowski
 100  Jimmy Robertson

Televised stage centuries

 147, 104, 102  Judd Trump 
 145, 141, 130, 118  Shaun Murphy
 134, 134, 117  Ronnie O'Sullivan
 133  Peter Ebdon
 132  Ryan Day
 126  Mark Selby
 119, 107  Stephen Maguire
 112  Alfie Burden
 111  Neil Robertson
 110  Mark Davis
 106, 103  Liang Wenbo
 106  Mark King
 103  Matthew Selt
 100  Mark Allen

References

External links

2015
2015 in snooker
Masters
Sports competitions in Berlin